Centennial is a neighbourhood in Moncton, New Brunswick.

History
See History of Moncton and Timeline of Moncton history

Places of note

Bordering communities

Notable people

See also
List of neighbourhoods in Moncton

References

Neighbourhoods in Moncton